Arthur Ribeiro (born 21 March 1942) is a Brazilian fencer. He competed in the individual and team épée events at the 1968 Summer Olympics and the individual épée at the 1976 Summer Olympics.

References

External links
 

1942 births
Living people
Brazilian male épée fencers
Olympic fencers of Brazil
Fencers at the 1968 Summer Olympics
Fencers at the 1976 Summer Olympics
Pan American Games medalists in fencing
Pan American Games gold medalists for Brazil
Pan American Games silver medalists for Brazil
Fencers at the 1963 Pan American Games
Fencers at the 1967 Pan American Games
Fencers at the 1971 Pan American Games
20th-century Brazilian people